Welton Felipe Marcos Soares (born June 15, 1986) is a Brazilian central defender who currently plays for Mirassol.

Welton Felipe began his professional career with Clube Atlético Mineiro. In 2012, he was loaned to Boa Esporte Clube where he played in Campeonato Brasileiro Série B.

References

External links
CBF

1986 births
Living people
Brazilian footballers
Brazilian expatriate footballers
Campeonato Brasileiro Série A players
Clube Atlético Mineiro players
Vitória Futebol Clube (ES) players
Atlético Clube Goianiense players
Avaí FC players
Clube Náutico Capibaribe players
Boa Esporte Clube players
Mirassol Futebol Clube players
Expatriate footballers in China
Changchun Yatai F.C. players
Campeonato Brasileiro Série B players
Footballers from Belo Horizonte
Association football defenders